Franz Betz (born 18 January 1952) is a German former cross-country skier. He competed at the 1972 Winter Olympics and the 1976 Winter Olympics.

References

External links
 

1952 births
Living people
German male cross-country skiers
Olympic cross-country skiers of West Germany
Cross-country skiers at the 1972 Winter Olympics
Cross-country skiers at the 1976 Winter Olympics
People from Ostallgäu
Sportspeople from Swabia (Bavaria)